Kemal Inat is a professor of Turkish Foreign Policy and Middle East Politics in the Department of International Relations at Sakarya University. Inat is founding director of Sakarya University Middle East Institute and head of Department of International Relations, Sakarya University. He also serves in Sakarya Bilgi Kültür Merkezi as member of the board.

Early years
Kemal Inat received his BA in International Relations from Ankara University in 1992 and his MA from University of Siegen in Germany in 1997. He received his Ph.D. from the same university upon completion of his doctoral thesis titled "Türkische Nahostpolitik am Anfang des 21. Jahrhunderts" (Turkey's Middle East Policy at the Dawn of 21st Century) in 2000.

Sakarya University
Since 1997, Inat has been a member of the faculty of Department of International Relations, Sakarya University. He became an associate professor in 2006, a full professor in 2011. From 2010–2013, he served as chairman of the Institute of Social Science at Sakarya University. In 2014, he served as the dean of Faculty of Economic and Administrative Sciences for a short period. Since 2015, he serves as the head of the Department of International Relations and chairman of Middle East Institute.

Academic Studies
Inat has published numerous articles on Middle East politics and Turkish foreign policy in Turkish. Inat is the editor and the main contributor of "Ortadoğu Yıllığı" (The Middle East Yearbook) published since 2005. He is also the editor of Türk Dış Politikası Yıllığı (Turkish Foreign Policy Annual) published since 2009 by SETA Publication. Added to these two annual, Inat's academic articles have been published in national and international peer-reviewed journals. These journals include Finanspolitik & Ekonomik Yorumlar, Bilgi and Demokrasi Platformu. He currently teaches as a professor on Middle East politics, Turkish foreign policy and international conflicts.

His political commentaries appeared in Turkish dailies such as Star, and Sabah.

Views
Inat is known as a public and academic supporter of an EU-like supranational organization for the Middle East led by Turkey and Iran. He likens cooperation between Turkey and Iran to the cooperation between Germany and France, resulted in the establishment of European Union. According to Inat, only such an organization in the Middle East can end conflicts and wars among the states in the region as the EU did after the Second World War.

Economic Cooperation Organization appears as the main institutional platform through which Turkey and Iran can increase their economic interdependence, which is the first phase of an EU-like supranational organization in the Middle East. For Inat, the existing volume of trade between the two countries, which was 16 billion dollars in 2011, is not enough to mention an economic interdependence between Iran and Turkey.

Since foreign interventions are proved as wrong solution for regional conflicts, the only way to solve regional conflicts is the rise of regional powers. Given their economic capacities and relations, none of countries in the Middle East can be counted as regional power. If Turkey and Iran, for Inat, are able to increase their economic interdependence, they would emerge as regional powers, capable to end conflicts in the region.

Selected publications

1. Dünya Çatışmaları, 2 Volumes, (with Burhanettin Duran and Muhittin Ataman) (Ankara: Nobel Yayınları, 2010) (in Turkish)

2. Foreign Policy in the Greater Middle East: Central Middle Eastern Countries, (with Wolfgang Gieler) (Berlin: WVB-Wissenschaftlicher Verlag Berlin, 2005)

3. “Türkische Aussenpolitik zwischen Europa und Amerika”, Blätter für deutsche und internationale Politik, Oktober 2005: 1237-1241

4. "Alman Dış Politikası’nın Temel Belirleyicileri: Tarih, Ekonomi ve Güvenlik", Finanspolitik ve Ekonomik Yorumlar, 48(556), 2011: 45-55.

5. "Economic Relations between Turkey and Germany", Insight Turkey, Vol. 18, No. 1, 2016, pp. 21–35.

References 

Ankara University alumni
Living people
Academic staff of Sakarya University
Turkish political scientists
Turkish social scientists
1971 births